Çayköy may refer to:

Çayköy, Alaplı, a village in Alaplı District, Zonguldak Province, Turkey
Çayköy, Aşkale
Çayköy, Bayat
Çayköy, Çaycuma, a village in Çaycuma District, Zonguldak Province, Turkey
Çayköy, Ergani
Çayköy, Gölyaka
Çayköy, Göynük, a village in the District of Göynük, Bolu Province, Turkey
Çayköy, Hamamözü, a village in Amasya Province, Turkey
Çayköy, İnhisar, a village in Bilecik Province, Turkey
Çayköy, Kaş, a village in Antalya Province, Turkey
Çayköy, Mecitözü
Çayköy, Mengen, a village in the District of Mengen, Bolu Province, Turkey